Mitch Morris (born October 15, 1979) is an American actor.  His full birth name is John Mitchell Morris.

Biography
Morris was raised in Portland, Texas. He graduated from Gregory-Portland High School in 1998. As a trumpet player, he was offered a music scholarship to the University of North Texas, but turned it down to study Radio, Television and Film. After moving to Los Angeles, he first appeared as a model in an ad campaign for American Eagle Outfitters. Soon after, he began making guest appearances on shows such as Buffy the Vampire Slayer, ER and Presidio Med.

In 2003, Morris made his stage debut in the LA revival of the Pulitzer Prize-nominated play Summertree. He then led the "pink posse," as Cody Bell on Showtime's Queer as Folk before playing CIA tech-genius Ken Watkins on Jerry Bruckheimer's E-Ring.  Morris can also be seen in the police drama, Honor.

Morris played the role of Griff in Todd Stephens' sex comedy, Another Gay Movie, which made its world premiere at the 2006 Tribeca Film Festival. Morris holds a B.A. in psychology from California State University, Northridge and a J.D. from Villanova University School of Law and a MFA in creative writing at Sarah Lawrence College.  Morris practiced with the Kane Law Firm in Los Angeles. As of 2022, his law license is still active and is a member of the California Bar.   He then became a lecturer in writing and a chair of college writing at Purchase College in New York, New York.

It is believed that he is openly gay.

References

External links 

1979 births
Living people
Male actors from Texas
Male models from Texas
American male film actors
American male television actors
American gay actors
University of North Texas alumni
People from Portland, Texas